Nationality words link to articles with information on the nation's poetry or literature (for instance, Irish or France).

Events
 Winter — This magazine founded in the United States by Robert Grenier and Barrett Watten
 March – Cuban poet Herberto Padilla is arrested in Havana and released only after signing a confession stating he is a "vicious character" who took part in counterrevolutionary activities. A letter to Fidel Castro published May 20 in Paris from 60 leftist intellectuals, all supporters of the Cuban revolution, protests Padilla's treatment and accuses Castro of imposing Stalinism on Cuba. Among the 60: Jean-Paul Sartre, Simone de Beauvoir, Susan Sontag, Alberto Moravia, Carlos Fuentes, and Mario Vargas Llosa (who saya he continues to support the Cuban revolution). Julio Cortázar of Argentina says he stands by Castro in a verse manifesto, Policrítica en la hora de los chacales
 April 8 – Release of Right On!, a film directed by Herbert Danska, of poetry recitations with bongo accompaniments on New York City streets
 April 21 – The 13th century Codex Regius is returned from Denmark to Iceland under naval escort.
 July 2 – Release of The Canterbury Tales, a film directed by Pier Paulo Pasolini, providing a soft-pornographic, controversial version of four tales by Geoffrey Chaucer
 Counter/measures magazine is founded in the United States by X. J. Kennedy and his wife, Dorothy. The magazine champions poetry written in traditional patterns and is an influence in the later creation of the New Formalism movement.

Works published in English
Listed by nation where the work was first published and again by the poet's native land, if different; substantially revised works listed separately:

Canada
 Margaret Atwood, Power Politics
 bill bissett, Nobody Owns the Earth
 George Bowering, Touch: Selected Poems 1960–1970
 Louis Dudek, Collected Poetry. Montréal: Delta Canada.
 Northrop Frye, The Bush Garden (scholarship)
 John Glassco, Selected Poems.  Toronto: Oxford University Press.
 Bill Howell, The Red Fox
 Irving Layton, The Collected Poems of Irving Layton. Toronto: McClelland and Stewart.
 Irving Layton, Nailpolish. Toronto: McClelland and Stewart.
 Kenneth Leslie, The Poems of Kenneth Leslie [ed. Sean Haldane.] Ladysmith, Quebec: Ladysmith Press.
 Richard Lewis, editor, I Breathe a New Song anthology of poems by Eskimos
 Dorothy Livesay:
 Plainsongs. Fredericton, NB: Fiddlehead Poetry Books.
 Plainsongs Extended. Fredericton, NB: Fiddlehead Poetry Books.
 Disasters of the Sun. Burnaby, BC: Blackfish Press.
 Anne Marriott, Countries, Fredericton, NB: Fiddlehead Poetry Books.
 George McWhirter, Catalan Poems (winner of the 1972 Commonwealth Poetry Prize)
 Alden Nowlan, Between Tears and Laughter
 Michael Ondaatje, editor, The Broken Ark, animal verse; Ottawa: Oberon; revised as A Book of Beasts, 1979 (anthology) 
 Andreas Schroeder, File of Uncertainties, a chapbook (Sono Nis Press)
 Raymond Souster, The Years.Ottawa: Oberon Press.
 Phyllis Webb, Selected Poems 1954–65
 Dale Zieroth and four other poets, Mindscapes

India, in English
 Jayanta Mahapatra:
 Close the Sky, Ten by Ten ( Poetry in English ), Calcutta: Dialogue Publications
 Svayamvara and Other Poems ( Poetry in English ), Calcutta: Writers Workshop, India .
 Arvind Krishna Mehrotra, Pomes / Poemes / Poemas ( Poetry in English ),
 G. S. Sharat Chandra, April in Nanjangud ( Poetry in English ), London: London Magazine
 Michael Chacko Daniels, Split into Two ( Poetry in English ), Calcutta: Writers Workshop, India .
 Keki N. Daruwalla, Apparition in April ( Poetry in English ), Calcutta: Writers Workshop, India .
 Amaresh Datta, Captive Moments ( Poetry in English ), Calcutta: Writers Workshop, India
 Subhoranjan Das Gupta, Bodhisattva and Other Poems ( Poetry in English ), Calcutta: Writers Workshop, India .
 Gopal R. Honnalgere, A Wad of Poems, Calcutta: Writers Workshop, India
 Suniti Namjoshi:
 More Poems ( Poetry in English ), Calcutta: Writers Workshop, India.
 Cyclone in Pakistan ( Poetry in English ), Calcutta: Writers Workshop, India .
 Nolini Kanta Gupta, Collected Works, five volumes, published this year through 1976; Pondicherry: Sri Aurobindo Book Distribution Agency
 Subhas Chandra Saha, editor, Modern Indo-Anglian Love Poetry, anthology; Calcutta: Writers Workshop, India

New Zealand
 Fleur Adcock, High Tide in the Garden, London: Oxford University Press (New Zealand poet who moved to England in 1963)
 James K. Baxter, Jerusalem Daybook
 Bob Orr, Blue Footpaths
 Ian Wedde, Homage to Matisse

United Kingdom
 Fleur Adcock, High Tide in the Garden, New Zealand native living in and published in the United Kingdom
 George Barker, Poems of Places and People
 Frances Bellerby, Selected Poems
 George Mackay Brown
 Fishermen with Ploughs
 Poems New and Selected
 Tony Connor, In the Happy Valley
 John Cotton, Old Movies
 Maureen Duffy, Love Child
 Michael Ffinch, Voices Round a Star
 Veronica Forrest-Thomson, Language-Games
 Elaine Feinstein, The Magic Apple Tree, Hutchinson
 Robert Garioch, pen name of Robert Garioch Sutherland, The Big Music, and Other Poems
 Thom Gunn, Moly, with some poems written under the influence of LSD; others described the experience of taking it
 Adrian Henri, Autobiography
 Geoffrey Hill, Mercian Hymns, prose poems
 James Kirkup, The Body Servant
 Paul Muldoon, Knowing My Place, Northern Ireland native published in the United Kingdom
 Sylvia Plath, American poet published in the United Kingdom (posthumous):
 Crossing the Water, published this year but containing poems written in 1960 and 1961
 Winter Trees
 Jeremy Robson, editor, The Young British Poets anthology
 Vernon Scannell, Selected Poems
 Jon Silkin, Amana Grass
 Stephen Spender, The Generous Days
 Donald Ward, The Dead Snake
 Patricia Whittaker (poet), The Flying Men

United States
 Dick Allen,  Anon and Various Time Machine Poems
 Maya Angelou, Just Give Me a Cool Drink of Water 'fore I Diiie
 Gwendolyn Brooks:
 Black Steel: Joe Frazier and Muhammad Ali
 The World of Gwendolyn Brooks
 Aloneness
 Ted Berrigan and Anne Waldman, Memorial Day
 Ted Berrigan, Train Ride
 Paul Blackburn, The Journals: Blue Mounds Entries
 John Ciardi, Lives of X
 Cid Corman, Sun Rock Man (New Directions)
 Ed Dorn:
 Spectrum Breakdown: A Microbook, Athanor Books
 By the Sound, Frontier Press; republished with a new preface by the author, Black Sparrow Press, 1991
 A Poem Called Alexander Hamilton, Tansy/Peg Leg Press
 Lawrence Ferlinghetti, Back Roads to Far Places (New Directions)
 Robert Fitzgerald, Spring Shade, collected poems and translations, 1931–1970 (New Directions)
 Donald S. Fryer, Songs and Sonnets Atlantean
 Michael S. Harper, History Is Your Own Heartbeat, won the Black Academy of Arts & Letters Award for poetry
 John Hollander, The Night Mirror
 Hugh Kenner, The Pound Era (University of California Press), Canadian writing and published in the United States; criticism
 Galway Kinnell, The Book of Nightmares
 Stanley Kunitz, The Testing Tree
 James McMichael, Against the Falling Evil
 Carl Rakosi, Ere-Voice
 Adrienne Rich, The Will to Change
 Richard Shelton, The Tattooed Desert
 Charles Simic, Dismantling the Silence
 Clark Ashton Smith, Selected Poems
 Richard Wilbur, translator, The School for Wives by Molière (in verse)
 James Wright, Collected Poems, including 30 new poems

Other in English
 Kofi Awoonor, Night of My Blood, Ghana
 John Figueroa, editor, Caribbean Voices, anthology, Evans Brothers, Caribbean
 Oswald Mbuyiseni Mtshali, Sounds of a Cowhide Drum, South Africa
 Geoff Page and Philip Roberts, Two Poets, St Lucia: University of Queensland Press, Australia
 Chris Wallace-Crabbe, Australia:
 Editor: Australian Poetry 1971, anthology, Sydney: Angus & Robertson
 Where the Wind Came, Sydney: Angus and Robertson

Works published in other languages
Listed by nation where the work was first published and again by the poet's native land, if different; substantially revised works listed separately:

Denmark
 Jørgen Leth, Eventyret om den sædvanlige udsigt
 Klaus Rifbjerg, Mytologi

French language

Canada, in French
 Jacques Brault, La Poésie ce matin (published in Paris)
 Raoul Duguay, L'Apokalypso
 Paul-Marie Lapointe, Le Réel absolu (Editions de l'Hexagone)
 Gilbert Langevin:
 Ouvrir le feu
 Stress
 Rina Lasnier, La Salle des rêves
 Olivier Marchand, Par Détresse et tendresse (Editions de l'Hexagone)
 Pierre Nepveu, Voies rapides, Montréal: HMH
 Claude Péloquin, Pour la Grandeur de l'Homme

France
 Anne-Marie Albiach, Etat
 M. Bataille, Le Cri dans le mur
 L. Bérimont, L'Évidence même
 Yves Bonnefoy, Traité du pianiste 
 René Char:
 L'Honneur devant Dieu
 Le nu perdu ("Nakedness Lost")
 P. Damarix, L'Expérience magique
 Alain Delahaye, L'Eveil des traversees
 Jean Follain, Éspaces d'instants, the poet was killed in an accident days after publication
 Robert Marteau, Sibylles
 Francis Ponge, La Fabrique du Pré
 Jacques Roubaud, Octavio Paz, Charles Tomlinson and Edoardo Sanguineti, Renga

Anthologies
 J. L. Bédouin, editor, La Poésie Surréaliste
 Pierre Seghers, editor, La Poésie symboliste

Hebrew
 Leah Goldberg,  (posthumous)
 I. Efros, collected poems
 D. Avidan, 
 Y. Amichai, 
 N. Yonatan, 
 D. Pagis, 
 R. Adi, 
 A. Eldon, 
 R. Shani, 
 M. Meir, 
 M. Oren, 
 M. Megged, editor, anthology of modern Hebrew poetry
 E. Silberschlag, 
 R. Avinoam, 
 R. Lee,

Hungary
 György Petri, Magyarázatok M. számára

India
In each section, listed in alphabetical order by first name:

Assamese
 Hiren Bhattacharya, Mor Des Mor Premar Kavita ("Poems of My Country and of My Love"); Assamese language
 Nilmani Phookan; Assamese language:
 Japani Kavita, Guwahati, Assam: Barua Book Agency, Assamese-language
 Phuli Thaka Suryamukhi Phultor Pine ("Towards the Blooming Sunflower")

Other languages in India
 K. Satchidanandan, Malayalam-language:
 Anchu Sooryan, ("Five Suns")
 Kurukshetram, ("Studies in Modern Poetry"); scholarship
 Nirendranath Chakravarti, Ulongo Raja, Kolkata: Ananda Publishers; Bengali-language
 Udaya Narayana Singh, Amrtasya Putraah, Calcutta: Lok Sahitya Parishad, Maithili-language
 Vinod Kumar Shukla, Lagbhag Jai Hind, Sindhi: Ashok Vajpeyi; Hindi-language

Italy
 Attilio Bertolucci, Viaggio d'inverno ("Winter Voyage"), marking a change of style in the author's poetry
 Libero De Libero, Di brace in brace
 Eugenio Montale:
 Satura (1962–1970) (published in January); Italy
 Diario del '71 e del '72 (poetry) a private edition of 100 copies; a second, nonprivate edition was published in 1973; Italy

Norway
 Hans Borli, Isfuglen
 Alfred Hauge, Det evige sekund
 Peter R. Holm, Synslinjer
 Ernst Orvil, Dikt i utvalg
 Sigmund Skard, Popel ved flypass

Portuguese language

Brazil
 Joaquim Cardozo, 
 Murilo Mendes, 
 Henriqueta Lisboa, 
 Manuel Bandeira, a selection from previous books
 Foed Castro Chamma, 
 Anderson Braga Horta,

Spanish language

Latin America
 Delmira Agustini, Poesías completas, prólogue and notes by Manuel Alvar, posthumously published (died 1914), Barcelona: Editorial Labor, Uruguayan poet published in Spain
 Herberto Padilla, published before his arrest in Cuba (see Events above)
 Roberto Fernández Retamar,  (Cuba)
 José Lezama Lima,  (Cuba)
 Ernesto Mejía Sánchez,  (Nicaragua)
 Carlos Solórzano,  (Guatemala)
 Five authors, including Agustín del Rosario, 
 M.L. Mendoza,

Spain
 Delmira Agustini, Poesías completas, prólogue and notes by Manuel Alvar, posthumously published (died 1914), Barcelona: Editorial Labor, Uruguayan poet published in Spain
 Vicente Aleixandre, 
 Justo Jorge Padrón, Los oscuros fuegos
 José Angel Valente, essays
 José María Valverde,

Sweden
 Ylva Eggehorn, Ska vi dela
 Bo Setterlind, Himlen har landat
 Karl Vennberg, Sju ord pa tunnelbanan
 Lars Forssell, Oktober dikter ("October Poems")
 Gören Palm, Varför har nätterna inga namn?
 Kerstin Thorvall, Följetong i skärt och svart

Yiddish
 Brakha Coodley, Not on Bread Alone
 Leo Kussman, Ballads of a Generation
 Berl Siegal, Poems for Children
 Mier Shtiker, Jewish Landscape, Volume 2
 M. M. Saffir, Creator of Various Dreams
 Menakhem Stern, Songs at Midnight
 Rochelle Weprinski, The Only Star
 Aaron Zeitlin, Poems of Destruction and Faith
 Joseph Kerler, Song Between Teeth
 Jacob Sternberg, The Circle of Years

Other
 Simin Behbahani, Rastakhiz ("Resurrection"), Persia
 Paul Celan, Snow Part (Schneepart), German
 Odysseus Elytis, Ο ήλιος ο ηλιάτορας ("The Sovereign Sun"), Greece
 Alan Llwyd, Y March Hud ("The Magic Horse"), Welsh
 F. Pratz, Deutsche Gedichte von 1900 bis zur Gegenwart, anthology, German
 Ndoc Gjetja, Rrezatim ("Radiation"), his first book of poetry; Albania
 Seán Ó Ríordáin, Línte Liombó (Limbo Lines), Irish language in Ireland
 Siegbert Prawer, editor, Seventeen Modern German Poets, anthology published by Oxford University Press in the United Kingdom, poems in German
 Hans Verhagen, Duizenden zonsondergangen ("Thousands of sunsets"), Netherlands

Awards and honors
 Nobel Prize in Literature: Pablo Neruda, Chilean poet and diplomat

Canada
 See 1971 Governor General's Awards for a complete list of winners and finalists for those awards.

United Kingdom
 Alice Hunt Bartlett Prize: Geoffrey Hill, Mercian Hymns
 Cholmondeley Award: Charles Causley, Gavin Ewart, Hugo Williams
 Eric Gregory Award: Martin Booth, Florence Bull, John Pook, D. M. Warman, John Welch
 Queen's Gold Medal for Poetry: Stephen Spender
 First Whitbread Award for Poetry: Geoffrey Hill, Mercian Hymns

United States
 Consultant in Poetry to the Library of Congress (later the post would be called "Poet Laureate Consultant in Poetry to the Library of Congress"): Josephine Jacobsen appointed this year.
 Bollingen Prize: Richard Wilbur and Mona Van Duyn
 Frost Medal: Melville Cane
 National Book Award for Poetry: Mona Van Duyn, To See, To Take
 Pulitzer Prize for Poetry: William S. Merwin, The Carrier of Ladders
 Fellowship of the Academy of American Poets: James Wright

Elsewhere
 Goodman Fielder Wattie Book Award for Poetry: Rosemary Rolleston, William & Mary Rolleston

Births
 June 28 – Sophie Hannah, English poet and novelist
 September 27 – Petrus Akkordeon, German poet
 October 18 – Jan Wagner, German poet
 November 18 – Terrance Hayes, American poet
 Jason Walford Davies, Welsh poet and academic
 Matthew Hollis, English poet, literary biographer and editor

Deaths
Birth years link to the corresponding "[year] in poetry" article:
 January 2 – E. V. Knox (born 1881), English poet and satirist
 May 9 – Ogden Nash, 68, American poet best known for writing pithy and funny light verse
 March 7 – Stevie Smith, 67, British poet and novelist, of a brain tumor
 March 9 – Jean Follain, French poet
 March 17 – Hiraide Shū 平出修 (born 1878), Japanese, late Meiji period novelist, poet, and lawyer; represented defendant in the High Treason Incident; a co-founder of the literary journal Subaru
 June 5 – Clifford Dyment (born 1914), British poet, literary critic and editor, and journalist
 June 6 – Edward Andrade (born 1887), English physicist and poet.
 June 13 – Hinatsu Kōnosuke 日夏耿之介, a pen-name of Higuchi Kunito (born 1890), Japanese, poet, editor and academic known for romantic and gothic poetry patterned after English literature; fervent Roman Catholic, co-founder, with Horiguchi Daigaku and Saijo Yaso, of Shijin ("Poets") magazine
 June 25 – Charles Vildrac, French poet and playwright
 July 3 – Jim Morrison, 27, American singer, songwriter, poet; best known as the lead singer and lyricist of The Doors
 July 13 – R. A. K. Mason (born 1905), New Zealand
 September (exact date not known) — Paul Blackburn, 44, American poet and translator, from esophageal cancer
 September 9 – Lenore G. Marshall, 72
 September 20 or September 21 (sources differ) – Giorgos Seferis, Greek poet and winner of a Nobel Prize for Literature
 October 10 – J. C. Beaglehole (born 1901), New Zealand historian and poet
 November 14 – Kyōsuke Kindaichi 金田一 京助 (born 1882), Japanese linguist and poet, father of linguist Haruhiko Kindaichi
 November 19 – Jacob Glatstein, 75, American Yiddish poet and critic
 November 25 – Andrew Young (born 1885), Scottish-born poet and clergyman
 December 14 – Munir Chowdhury also "Munier Chowdhury" (born 1925), Bengali educator, playwright, literary critic and political dissident
 December 18 – Aleksandr Tvardovsky, 61, Russian poet, editor of the official Soviet literary journal Novy Mir who fought hard to maintain its independence

See also

 Poetry
 List of poetry awards
 List of years in poetry

Notes

20th-century poetry
Poetry